Infante Juan, Count of Barcelona (Juan Carlos Teresa Silverio Alfonso de Borbón y Battenberg; 20 June 1913 – 1 April 1993), also known as Don Juan, was a claimant to the Spanish throne as Juan III. He was the third son and designated heir of King Alfonso XIII of Spain and Victoria Eugenie of Battenberg. His father was replaced by the Second Spanish Republic in 1931. Juan's son Juan Carlos I became king when Spain's constitutional monarchy was restored in 1975.

Early life
Juan was born at the Palace of San Ildefonso. His father was forced into exile when the Second Spanish Republic was proclaimed on 14 April 1931. Owing to the renunciations of his brothers Alfonso, Prince of Asturias, and Infante Jaime, Duke of Segovia, Infante Juan was thus next in line to the defunct Spanish throne. He thus received the title Prince of Asturias when he was serving with the Royal Navy in Bombay.

In March 1935, he passed his naval exams in gunnery and navigation, which would have entitled him to a lieutenant’s commission in the Royal Navy if he gave up his Spanish nationality. This, however, he refused to do.

Marriage
He met his future wife at a party hosted by Victor Emmanuel III of Italy on the day before his sister (Infanta Beatriz) was to be married. He married Princess María de las Mercedes of Bourbon-Two Sicilies (1910–2000), known in Spain as Doña María de las Mercedes de Borbón Dos-Sicilias y Orleans, in Rome on 12 October 1935.

Just before the birth of the Infante Juan Carlos, the Count of Barcelona decided to go hunting, with the doctor telling him and his wife that the future king would not be born for weeks. When he was told of the birth, he drove to the hospital so quickly that he broke an axle spring.

Children
They had four children:

Infanta Pilar, Duchess of Badajoz (30 July 1936 – 8 January 2020), who married Luis Gomez-Acebo y de Estrada, Viscount de la Torre, on 6 May 1967, and had five children
Juan Carlos I of Spain (born 5 January 1938), who married Princess Sophia of Greece and Denmark on 14 May 1962, and had three children
Infanta Margarita, Duchess of Soria and Duchess of Hernani (born 6 March 1939), who married Don Carlos Zurita y Delgado on 12 October 1972, and had two children
Infante Alfonso of Spain (3 October 1941 – 29 March 1956)

They lived in Cannes and Rome, and, with the outbreak of World War II, they moved to Lausanne to live with his mother, Queen Victoria Eugenie. Afterwards, they resided at Estoril, on the Portuguese Riviera.

Claim to the Spanish throne

In 1931, Juan was subject to dynastic negotiations between the Alfonsists and the Carlists, concluded in so-called Pact of Territet; it has never been implemented. Juan became heir apparent to the defunct Spanish throne after the renunciations of his two older brothers, Alfonso and Jaime, in 1933. To assert his claim to the throne, following his father's death he used the title of Count of Barcelona, a sovereign title associated with the Spanish crown.

In 1936, his father sent him to participate in the Spanish Civil War but he was arrested near the French border, and sent back by General Emilio Mola.

On 19 March 1945, he announced a manifesto in Lausanne, demanding he replace Franco: 

When General Francisco Franco declared Spain a monarchy in 1947, he characterized it as a "restoration". However, Franco was afraid that Juan would roll back the Spanish State because he favoured constitutional monarchy, which would restore parliamentary democracy. As a result, in 1969, Franco passed over Juan in favour of Juan's son, Juan Carlos, who Franco believed would be more likely to continue the dictatorship after his death. Juan Carlos later surprised many by his support of democratising Spain. Franco and Juan did not have a good relationship, with the latter constantly pressing Franco to restore the monarchy. Relations soured further when Juan called Franco an "illegitimate usurper".

Juan formally renounced his rights to the Spanish throne eight years after being displaced as recognised heir to the throne by Franco, and two years after his son, Juan Carlos, had become king.  In return, his son officially granted him the title of Count of Barcelona, which he had claimed for so long.

After his death in 1993, he was buried with honours due a king, under the name Juan III (his title if he had become king) in the Royal Crypt of the monastery of San Lorenzo del Escorial, near Madrid. His wife survived him by seven years.

He was fond of the sea, and joined the Naval School at San Fernando, Cádiz, and had tattoos of a marine theme from his time in the British Royal Navy.

Honours and arms

Honours

Arms

Ancestors

References 

1913 births
1993 deaths
People from the Province of Segovia
Francoist Spain
House of Bourbon (Spain)
Spanish infantes
Heirs apparent who never acceded
Captain generals of the Navy
Burials in the Pantheon of Kings at El Escorial
Spanish monarchists
Navarrese titular monarchs
Knights of the Golden Fleece of Spain
Grand Crosses of Naval Merit
Grand Crosses of Military Merit
Crosses of Aeronautical Merit
Grand Crosses of the Order of Saints George and Constantine
Knights Grand Cross of the Order of Saints Maurice and Lazarus
Recipients of the Order of the Crown (Italy)
Grand Crosses of the Order of Christ (Portugal)
Knights Grand Cross of the Order of the Immaculate Conception of Vila Viçosa
Bailiffs Grand Cross of Honour and Devotion of the Sovereign Military Order of Malta
Sons of kings